Binatisphinctes is an extinct genus of cephalopod belonging to the Ammonite subclass.

Distribution
Jurassic of France, Germany, India, Madagascar and Russia.

References

Jurassic ammonites
Ammonites of Europe
Callovian life